The  Nokia 8810 was a slider-style mobile phone handset manufactured by Nokia. The model was announced on March 18, 1998. It is notable for being among the first phones to have an internal antenna. It was designed to be the flagship and the most luxurious of all Nokia phones at the time, and was also one of the first phones with chrome plating.

Core features

Memory
The phonebook could store up to 250 names and numbers. Ten text messages could be stored in the internal memory. Contacts could also be stored on the SIM card, which allowed the user to keep a backup should they accidentally delete their contacts from the internal phone memory. The phone did not have any external memory options.

Calls
The call history of the 8810 stored 30 previous calls 10 dialed, 10 received and 10 missed. There were 35 preloaded monophonic ringtones on the phone and additional ringtones were available for download at a cost. The phone featured the ability to make conference calls, hold calls, and send DTMF tones. The phone did not feature a built-in loudspeaker, which was unusual considering many lower-quality and less expensive phones were built with loudspeakers.

Display and input
The Nokia 8810 has a five-line monochrome graphic display. Features include dynamic font size and soft key.

Connectivity
Besides the standard 2G network, the 8810 also features an infrared port, which was later adopted into other Nokia high-end phones.

Messaging
The phone used SMS with T9 predictive text input, with support for major European languages.

Messages could be up to 160 characters long. Compatible phones could send and receive picture messages in Nokia standard Smart Messaging, but not in later (universal) EMS. The phone could receive network operator logos and ringtones (up to five). Due to the lack of multimedia support for the phone, the Multimedia Messaging Service was not available on this phone. Similarly, email was also not supported.

Battery
The 8810 had two options for the battery: 600 MAh Ni-Mh or 400 MAh Lithium. The Ni-Mh was considered the standard battery and the lithium was the extended battery. The standard battery provided 30 minutes to 1 hour talk time and 15 to 60 hours standby time, and the extended battery provided 1 hour 40 minutes to 2 hours 50 minutes talk time and 36 to 133 hours standby time.

Applications
The Nokia 8810 had a calculator, a rudimentary currency converter, and a calendar application. This were considered advanced applications at the time, as was the phone's ability to transfer information to a computer or another Nokia device using an infrared sensor..

Other features

The Nokia 8810 weighed 118 g with the standard Ni-Mh battery and 98 g with the lithium battery. Its dimensions were 107×46×18 mm. The phone contained a few extra features: a clock, an alarm, and the popular game Snake. The phone could display any of 32 different languages.

Design and reception
In 1998, the Nokia 8810 was considered a luxury phone. This was due to the sleek new design the 8810 presented. It had no external whip or stub antenna, which was unusual for the time. Instead, it featured an internal antenna, which allowed the phone to be stored in a pocket upside down. Nokia had invested hundreds of hours into research on how people hold their phones for calls; this allowed them to place the antenna accordingly. The 8810 is tapered and weighted to encourage users to hold it below the antenna, minimizing interference. However, this also led to a poorer signal reception compared to an external antenna, which meant battery life was reduced. It was encased entirely in plastic parts; this case would slide down to reveal the keypad. This new appearance, in particular the lack of an external antenna, meant the 8810 had a desirable advantage over its competitors and enjoyed moderate success. The choice to make the antenna internal had a negative effect on battery life, but Nokia felt this was an acceptable tradeoff for getting rid of the external antenna.

References

External links
 Nokia customer service and support | Nokia phones
 Nokia 8810 - Full phone specifications

8810
Mobile phones with infrared transmitter
Slider phones
Mobile phones introduced in 1998